The National Palace of Culture (abbreviated as , NDK), located in Sofia, the capital of Bulgaria, is the largest, multifunctional conference and exhibition centre in Southeast Europe. It was opened in 1981 in celebration of Bulgaria's 1300th anniversary.

The centre was initiated at the suggestion of Lyudmila Zhivkova, daughter of the communist leader of the former People's Republic of Bulgaria Todor Zhivkov. The project was designed by a team of Bulgarian and foreign architects led by Alexander Georgiev Barov (1931–1999) along with Ivan Kanazirev. The landscaping of Bulgaria Square in front of the National Palace of Culture was designed by another team of architects and landscape engineers, led by Atanas Agura. Internally, the building exhibits a unified style, employing an octagonal motif and heavy, dark colours. Large bright murals depicting historical figures and events cover the main wall of many of the smaller halls.

During the 1990s, immediately following the change of the political model in the country, the NDK lost a significant portion of its property, including infrastructure, commercial areas, and car parks. Since 2011, the NDK has been restructured into a commercial company, but it remains a state property. It is self-sustaining, receiving no subsidies. The first public financial report of the Palace was released in 2012. A substantial part of the revenues are invested annually in new projects and its own cultural events.

The Festival and Congress Centre (FCC) is the Varna branch of the NDK. It was founded in 1986 and it is gradually becoming the center of some of the most prestigious events in the field of art and culture. FCC is host to artistic events and festivals, scientific meetings, seminars, and more. FCC is the face of Bulgaria when it comes to prestigious international congress organizations such as ICCA, EFCT, AIPC and it is included in the only pan-European network of cinemas, Europe Cinema, in the European Union (EU).

In July 2005, the National Palace of Culture was proclaimed the best congress centre in the world for the year by the International Organization of Congress Centres.

The conference centre is equipped to host a variety of events, including concerts, multilingual conferences, exhibitions, and shows. It has an area of 123,000 square meters on eight floors and three underground levels. The National Palace of Culture has 13 halls and 15,000 square meters of exhibition area, a trade centre and a car park. The main hall can seat over 3,000 people.

The Sofia International Film Festival takes place in the NDK.

Concerts

The National Palace of Culture is a major venue for concerts in the Bulgarian capital. Its halls are well designed and equipped with comfortable seats.
Many world-famous singers, musicians and dancers have performed here over the years some among them being: José Carreras, Mark Knopfler, Jon Lord, Gary Moore, Steve Vai, Anastacia, Sting, Joe Cocker, and Uriah Heep.

Management
The Palace has been managed by a board of directors since May 2011. , the board comprises: Valentin Krastev (Chairman), Miroslav Borshosh (executive director) and Lyudmil Veselinov (board member).

Floor space and facilities

The building's total functional area is 123,000 square meters over eight floors, four panoramic terraces, and three underground levels. There are 12 multi-functional halls seating from 50 to 4,000. Each hall has a thematic appearance.

There are also 54 offices and seminar rooms, 17,000 square meters of lobbies suitable as exhibition space, plus five restaurants and catering companies.

The venue's staff includes professional conference teams to assist in preparation and implementation of events. Facilities include: sound systems, lighting, simultaneous translation, video and recording equipment, stage sets and exhibition modules.

Activities
Annually, the NDK is host to over 300 events such as international conventions, political forums, business conferences, scientific symposiums, music and film festivals, concerts, dance performances, theatre, exhibitions and fairs.

Other regular events include media presentations in a dedicated 60-seat "Press Club", training seminars and lectures.

Guest orchestras and performing companies have included: the Bolshoi Theatre, Teatro alla Scala, S. M. Kirov Academic Leningrad Theater of Opera and Ballet, London Symphony Orchestra, St. Petersburg Symphony Orchestra, Vienna Philharmonic Orchestra, Vienna State Opera, Royal Swedish Ballet, the British Royal Ballet, and Spanish National Ballet. Guest conductors have included: Herbert von Karajan, Claudio Abbado, Riccardo Muti, David Giménez Carreras, Emil Tabakov, Rossen Milanov, Naiden Todorov, and Metodi Matakiev.

Notable guest performers have included: Andrea Bocelli, José Carreras, Nikolay Gyaurov, Gena Dimitrova, Montserrat Caballé, Uriah Heep, Mezzoforte, Al Bano and Romina Power, Omara Portuondo, Ibrahim Ferrer and Buena Vista Social Club, Sting, Paco de Lucía, Chris de Burgh, Joe Cocker, James Brown, Goran Bregovic, Anna Tomova-Sintova, Mark Knopfler, Giya Kancheli, Yuri Bashmet, The Mystery of Bulgarian Voices, Hugh Laurie and others.

Dance and show performances have included: Michael Flatley's Lord of the Dance, the Fire of Anatolia, Night of the Sultans, Shaman, David Copperfield, Cirque Éloize and others. Art exhibitions have included Joan Miró – Artworks, Oscar Tusquets Blanca - Design, Vladimir Dimitrov - The Master, Stoyan Iliev, and National Art Gallery.

It is also the venue of the Opening Ceremony of the 1983 Winter Universiade.

Production

The Palace actively supports Bulgarian culture – as an organizer and producer of its own festivals and events. It is a producer of three annual festivals, which have gained great national and international popularity such as the Salon of the Arts held in May.

In partnership with cultural institutions, diplomatic missions, and foundations, the NDK participates in the Sofia International Film Festival, The Sofia Musical Weeks, charity events, collaborated exhibitions and book launches.

In 2012 the NDK was a co-organizer of the forums for modern art, for city environment, Sofia Dance Week and Sofia Architecture Week. 
It is also host to the spring and autumn International Book Fair and to the B2B Fair Stroiko.

Salon of the Arts

Salon of the Arts is a traditional festival which celebrated its 20th anniversary edition in 2015. It is held annually in May and combines different forms and genres of art – music, dance, theatre, opera, ballet, cinema, and fine art. The festival's program is designed to appeal to a diverse audience of all ages and interests. An Award of the Salon is given for excellence in an area of art and culture.

Kinomania
Kinomania started in 1987 as a bi-yearly world film-screening event, featuring international films which have not been shown in Bulgaria. It takes place in November.

New Year Music Festival
This festival was inaugurated in 1986 by the conductor Emil Tchakarov (1948-1991), a talented protégé of Herbert von Karajan. It has hosted a variety of eminent musical groups and artists in December and culminates with a classical-music concert on 1 January.

Projects
As a consequence of a new and ambitious approach by the board of directors, a number of new projects have been introduced, including:

Salon of the Art Galleries
Begun in 2015, the salon aims to create opportunities for interaction between artists, galleries, patrons, media and the public. Spaces in the Palace are utilised as platforms for productive interaction such as creative discussions and partnerships. The inaugural Salon presented an exhibition entitled Georgi Bozhilov – Slona (1935–2001): Retrospective.

National Book Center
The National Book Centre promotes Bulgarian literature in terms of translation and popularization abroad. It is supported by the Ministry of Culture.

New Theater
This project provides production and performance opportunities for both established and new creative talent in diverse performance genres including orchestral and chamber music, drama, cinema and opera. Opened in March 2015, the theater is an intimate auditorium of 160 seats. A lobby contains a library of books on drama.

Azaryan Theater
This venue, named after the Bulgarian director Krikor Azaryan, opened in 2015. The amphitheater's size is second only to the National Theatre, and is intended to host quality performances of Bulgarian drama.

Works of art
The NDK is a natural home to over 80 monumental works of art - paintings, sculptures, mosaics, murals, woodcarvings and metal works, created especially for the interior of the Palace by leading Bulgarian artists from the second half of the twentieth century.

In the main building of the NDK there are works of art by some of the most established Bulgarian master artists – Dechko Uzunov, Marin Vurbanov, Svetlin Roussev, Pavel Koychev, Teofan Sokerov, Anton Donchev, Dimitur Kirov, Ivan Kirkov, Hristo Stefanov, Galin Malakchiev and others.

The palace's logo represents a phoenix, shaped by curved strips and rays positioned in a circle. The emblem is a work of graphic designer Stefan Kanchev.

The bronze artwork above the main entrance is the work of Georgi Chapkanov and represents a stylized sun reminiscent of the ceilings in old Bulgarian houses. The symbol has a diameter of about 7 meters. From its concave hemisphere radiate ears of corn.

In the Palace's lobby stands the gilded sculpture Revival, also known as Mother Bulgaria by the sculptor Dimitar Boykov, which symbolizes a welcoming and revived Sofia. A part of the interior of the NDK is another representative sign – a bird woven into sun rays, symbolizing the flight towards knowledge and light.

Awards
2010 Second place at the International contest for the Apex award by the International Association of Convention (AIPC)
2009 Silver award by New European Economy magazine for the best congress centre
2008 European Award for Quality by the Europe Business Assembly (EBA), a vanity award
2005 Apex Award Apex for the Best Convention Centre in the World by AIPC
2003 Second place at the International contest for the Apex award for the Best Convention Centre in the World by AIPC

International conferences

The centre has held international conferences such as the World Health Organization (WHO): World meeting of the regional commission of WHO for Europe and the  UNESCO: Conference of Ministers of Culture for South East Europe in 2012. In 2009 it hosted the Fifth International Congress on Energy Efficiency and Renewable Energy Sources in South East Europe and the Meeting of the chairpersons of the Economic and Social Councils of the Member States of the European Union. In 2007 the Annual Economic Forum of the countries from the Central European Initiative was held at the centre. In 2006, the twelfth meeting of foreign ministers of the countries of the Organization for Security and Cooperation in Europe (OSCE) was held. The 80th Conference of the Inter-Parliamentary Union was held in 1988.

Gallery

References

External links

 Official website
 Hotels close to The National Palace of Culture

Buildings and structures completed in 1981
Convention centres in Bulgaria
Buildings and structures in Sofia
Bulgarian culture
Culture in Sofia
Tourist attractions in Sofia
Economy of Sofia
Event venues established in 1981